Teenager of the Year is the second solo studio album by American musician Frank Black. The album was released in 1994 by 4AD in the United Kingdom and Elektra Records in the United States. It was co-produced by former Pere Ubu member Eric Drew Feldman, who also played keyboards on the album. Teenager also features work by several backing musicians, including Lyle Workman, Moris Tepper and Black's Pixies bandmate Joey Santiago.

The album reached No. 2 on Billboards Heatseekers chart and No. 131 on the Billboard 200 chart in 1994. The single "Headache" reached No. 10 on Billboards Modern Rock Tracks chart that year.

Although not originally well-received, the record is now widely praised by both critics and fans. The album is often cited as the high-point of Francis' post-Pixies catalogue, and was ranked No. 94 on Pitchfork's "Top 100 Albums of the 1990s".

Track listing

Personnel

Musicians
 Frank Black – vocals, guitar
 Eric Drew Feldman – bass, keyboards, synthetics
 Nick Vincent – drums, bass on track 11
 Lyle Workman – lead guitar
 Joey Santiago – lead guitar on tracks 8, 20, 21, 22 and second lead guitar on track 15
 Moris Tepper – lead guitar on tracks 11 and 17
Technical
 Eric Drew Feldman – producer
 Frank Black – producer
 Alistair Clay – producer (except on tracks 3, 7, 17 and 19), engineer
 David Bianco – additional engineer, mixing
 Andy Warwick – additional engineer
 Bill Cooper – additional engineer
 Efren Herrera – additional engineer
 Craig Doubet – assistant engineer
 Danny Alonso – assistant engineer
 Wolfgang Aichholz – assistant engineer
 Mike Aarvold – assistant engineer
 Matt Westfield – assistant engineer
 John Jackson – assistant engineer
 Frank Gryner – assistant engineer
 Wally Traugott – mastering
 V23 – design
 Michael Halsband – photography

Charts

References

Black Francis albums
1994 albums
4AD albums
Elektra Records albums